Pearl  is an American 2016 independent animated drama short film directed by Patrick Osborne. In 2017, it became the first VR film to be nominated for an Academy Award.

Plot
Pearl is the story of a girl and her dad as they cross the United States in an older model hatchback chasing their dreams. The music created by the father and daughter is the central narrator and the single perspective is viewed from the front passenger seat of the car, from where the viewer has a 360 degree view of all the action.

Accolades

References

External links
Pearl on Internet Movie Database

2016 films
2016 3D films
2010s American animated films
2010s animated short films
3D short films
2010s English-language films